Altrix trifolium is a species of sea snail, a marine gastropod mollusk in the family Fissurellidae, the keyhole limpets.

Description

The shell can grow to be 12 mm to 28 mm in length.

Distribution
Altrix trifolium can be found off of Yucatán, Colombia, and Barbados. It lives at a depth of 256 m to 1170 m.

References

External links

Fissurellidae
Gastropods described in 1881